The Adoption and Children (Scotland) Act 2007 is an Act of the Scottish Parliament and the chief source of law relating to adoption in Scotland.

Chapter 1: Local Authority Duties
Chapter One of the Act imposes a duty on all of Scotland's 32 local authorities to provide an adoption service in their area.

Chapter 2: The Adoption Process

Factors the court must consider
Chapter Two sets out the legislative framework behind the adoption process in Scotland. In deciding whether to make an adoption order, granting Parental Rights and Responsibilities (PRR) on the adopter with respect to the child (or children), the court must "regard the need to safeguard and promote the welfare of the child throughout the child's life as the paramount consideration", with particular emphasis on:
 The value of a stable family unit in the child's development.
 The child's ascertainable views regarding the decision (taking account of the child's age and maturity).
 The child's religious persuasion, racial origin and cultural and linguistic background.
 The likely effect on the child, throughout the child's life, of the making of an adoption order.

Adoption by a couple
For a couple to adopt a child, the following personal criteria must be fulfilled:
Both parties are aged over 21.
Neither member of the couple is a parent of the child.
That both partners are domiciled in the United Kingdom or Ireland (or have been habitually resident in the UK or Ireland for one year).
The partners are married, in a civil partnership or cohabiting (either heterosexual or homosexual).

Adoption by one person
A single person may adopt a child if they are aged over 21, domiciled in the UK or Ireland, and are either in a marriage, civil partnership or cohabiting relationship with the parent of the child. They may do so even if said child's birth parent is dead or missing.

Consent of the child's birth parents
Generally, the consent of an adoptee's parents or guardians who have Parental Rights & Responsibilities under the Children (Scotland) Act 1995 towards the child must be obtained before the court will issue an adoption order. However the consent of the birth parents may be ignored in the following circumstances:
The parent or guardian is dead.
The parent or guardian cannot be found or is incapable of giving consent.
The court views the parent/guardian as unfit to exercise their parental rights and responsibilities (and will continue to do so).
That, when none of the above applies, the court views dispensing the parent's consent as necessary to ensure the child's welfare.

Consent of the child
An adoption order cannot be made in respect of a child aged over 12 unless said child consents, or the court considers them not mature enough to consent

References

Adoption in the United Kingdom
Scots law